Spell of the Witch World is a collection of science fantasy short fiction by American writer Andre Norton, forming part of her Witch World series. It was first published in paperback by DAW Books in April 1972, and has been reprinted numerous times since. It has the distinction of being the first book released by that publisher. Early printings had cover art and a frontispiece by artist Jack Gaughan; later printings replaced the cover art (but not the frontispiece) with new art by Michael Whelan. The first hardcover edition was a photographic reprint of the DAW edition published by Gregg Press in 1977. It featured a new frontispiece by Alice D. Phalen and endpaper maps of the Witch World by Barbi Johnson.

Summary
The book collects three "Witch World" pieces by Norton, two novellas and one short story, all original to the collection.

Contents
"Dragon Scale Silver"
"Dream Smith"
"Amber out of Quayth"

Notes

1972 short story collections
Fantasy short story collections
Short story collections by Andre Norton
DAW Books books